Paulianoscirtus is a genus of beetles in the family Carabidae, containing the following species:

 Paulianoscirtus cordicollis Basilewsky, 1976
 Paulianoscirtus madecassus Basilewsky, 1976

References

Harpalinae